Beauties in Capri (Italian: Bellezze a Capri) is a 1951 Italian comedy film directed by Adelchi Bianchi and starring Nando Bruno, Ave Ninchi and Tamara Lees.

Cast
 Nando Bruno as Don Violante  
 Ave Ninchi as Cornelia  
 Anna Bianchi as Clelia  
 Armando Francioli as Gennaro  
 Tamara Lees as Concetta  
 Lauro Gazzolo as Don Camillo  
 Aroldo Tieri as Zalasky  
 Alberto Sorrentino as Pasquale 
 Anna Arena as Assunta  
 Carlo Delle Piane as Peppino  
 Mario Carotenuto as Il direttore del 'Dancing'  
 Virgilio Riento as Il maresciallo  
 Michele Malaspina as Procolo  
 Pamela Palma as La danzatrice  
 Augusto Gamucci as Ballerino  
 Carlo Romano as Vittorio  
 Marco Tulli as Il maestro di tuffi  
 Oscar Andriani as Il vescovo 
 Roberta Bianchi as La bambina  
 Guido Riccioli 
 Vanda Carr 
 Giovanna Mazzotti 
 Rita Andreana 
 Giorgio Consolini as Cantante
 Franco Carli as Cantante

References

Bibliography
 Lino Miccichè. Storia del cinema italiano: 1954-1959. Edizioni di Bianco & Nero, 2001.

External links
 

1952 comedy films
1952 films
Italian comedy films
1950s Italian-language films
Films directed by Adelchi Bianchi
Films set in Capri, Campania
Films with screenplays by Mario Amendola
Italian black-and-white films
1950s Italian films